This is a list of films produced by the Oriya film industry based in Bhubaneshwar and Cuttack in 2010:

A-Z

References

2010
Ollywood
2010s in Odisha
2010 in Indian cinema